10 Minute School (abbreviated as 10MS) is an online educational platform in Bangladesh created in 2015 by internet entrepreneur Ayman Sadiq from Comilla. The platform covers academic classes from classes 1 to 12 covering the entire academic syllabus of the Bangladesh schooling system, university admission subjects covering different branches of study, and skills development training.

History 

Ayman sadiq founded 10 Minute School in mid-2014 as a YouTube channel. Largely self-sponsored in the beginning, 10 Minute School did not initially have a website and solely reached students through educational infographics. It started creating video tutorials for mathematics and English and eventually started taking live classes on Facebook. 10 Minute School went on to cover the entire academic syllabus from Class 1 to  Class 12, university admission subjects covering topics from public and private university examinations and extensive software and skills training.

While one of the major challenges for an organization back then was to find a suitable sponsor to found its operational activities, it later came to be supported by telecom operator Robi Axiata Limited and the Ministry of Posts, Telecommunications and Information Technology.

In January 2022, 10 Minute School raised $2m seed fund from reputed Sequoia Capital.

References

External links 

 10 Minute Schools' official website

Education in Bangladesh
Bangladeshi websites